Thomas Leaming House is located in Middle Township, Cape May County, New Jersey, United States. The house was built in 1706 and was added to the National Register of Historic Places on August 1, 1997.

Leaming was a member the fifth session (June–August 1776) of the Provincial Congress of New Jersey which ordered the arrest of the colony's last royal governor William Franklin, approved the Declaration of Independence and wrote New Jersey's first state constitution (1776).

See also
National Register of Historic Places listings in Cape May County, New Jersey

References

Houses on the National Register of Historic Places in New Jersey
Houses completed in 1706
Houses in Cape May County, New Jersey
Middle Township, New Jersey
National Register of Historic Places in Cape May County, New Jersey
1706 establishments in New Jersey
New Jersey Register of Historic Places